This is a list of people who have appeared on the cover of GQ Russia, the Russian edition of GQ magazine, starting with the magazine's first issue in March 2001.

2001

2002

2003

2004

2005

2006

2007

2008

2009

2010

2011

2012

2013

2014

2015

2016

2017

2018

2019

GQ Style

References

External links
 Official website

GQ (magazine)
GQ Russia